Rap City is a music video television program block that originally aired on the Black Entertainment Television (BET) network from August 11, 1989, to November 8, 2008. The program was an exclusive showcase for hip hop music videos, and features interviews with and freestyles from popular rappers, and often has guest DJs serve as co-hosts.

History

Conception
The show was created by former BET VJ/producer Alvin Jones, a.k.a. "The Unseen VJ". This was a spin-off of the "Rap Week" segment of Video Vibrations, also hosted by "The Unseen VJ". While its competitor Yo! MTV Raps, which is now discontinued, mainly focused on all of the popular rappers, Rap City also included videos from up and coming underground rappers.

In the Spring of 1999, Stephen G.Hill President of Music Programming took Rap City from its format as a traveling show that went into the cities of the hottest rappers in the country, to an in studio format. Stephen G. Hill along with Senior Producer Craig Henry and Producer John Tucker was credited with creating a new show to fit a studio format the show was re-titled Rap City: Tha Basement Senior Producer Craig Henry created a 360° basement set that gave the illusion of a real basement and not a studio set. Producer John Tucker is noted for creating the iconic performance in the bathroom that became "The Booth".

Hosts and timeslots
Among notable previous hosts of the show are Chris Thomas (the first host of the show from 1989–1991). Throughout his run, Thomas was also known as "The Mayor of Rap City", or simply "The Mayor". Other hosts included Hans Dobson aka Prime (1989–1993), Prince DaJour (1991–1994), Joe Clair (1994–1999), Leslie Segar (a.k.a. Big Lez) (1994–1999), Big Tigger (1998–2005), DJ Mad Linx (2005–2006), J-Nicks (2005–2006) and Q-45 (2006–2008).

On September 13, 1999, Stephen G.Hill President of Music Programming along with Senior Producer Craig Henry and Producer John Tucker credited with creating a new show to fit a studio format for Rap City the show was re-titled Rap City: Tha Basement and newly hosted by Big Tigger (a.k.a. Tigger), who succeeded Joe Clair and Big Lez. On August 28, 2000, BET moved the show to a new time slot at 4 p.m. On January 18, 2005, the show was repackaged and host Big Tigger was replaced by Mad Linx, a DJ and radio personality. The transition was explained that Tigger's "mother" sold the basement and forced Big Tigger out to live with his father. On October 3, 2005, Mad Linx went on hiatus to host BET Road Show. For several months, the show was hosted by J-Nicks, a native of St. Louis. Occasionally, special guests (such as a hip hop star) would host Rap City. The network also shortened the shows run time from two to one hour.

On December 28, 2005, BET returned the show to its original 5 p.m. time slot. Mad Linx returned to his weekday routine on February 2, 2006. J-Nicks left to work as a weekday radio DJ for WHTA Hot 107.9 FM in Atlanta. On August 14, 2006, Q45 replaced Mad Linx on the show. On September 25, 2006, the time slot for Rap City changed to 4 p.m., and then flipped back to 5 p.m. in October 2006. From that moment on, Q45 hosted the show on Weekdays. Mad Linx hosted Rap City Top 10 on Saturdays and Big Tigger hosted the show as Rap City Presents... specials.

On September 17, 2007, BET changed the time slot of Rap City to 1 a.m. Eastern time. A time slot previously held by re-runs of The Parkers and other syndicated shows. In the timeslot that Rap City previously occupied, random music videos are now being shown. In October 2007, due to drop of ratings Rap City returned to its previous time slot at 5 p.m. In September 2008, Rap City obtained a new time of 3 p.m.

The Freestyle Booth

One of the most prominent and most popular segments of the show has been the freestyle booth. The booth was a segment that was added when Rap City becomes a studio format renamed Rap City Tha Basement. Producer John Tucker is credited with creating the now iconic segment The Booth located in the basement bathroom, the elements gave a real grass roots raw feel the show. In these particular segments, the guests would lay exclusive new (or often recycled) vocals on the spot. This came to place around Big Tigger's tenure, which also included a guest DJ every week. Seemingly, this concept was scrapped when "Tha Basement" concept left but it has since returned. This is now seen as a major staple of Rap City, although no hosts other than Joe Clair and Big Tigger have joined in during the freestyle sessions. On several occasions back in the early 2000s (decade), the freestyle booth was mostly, if not completely uncensored. Also when special guests come and leave they leave with a signature, in the booth, on the wall.

Finale
On October 1, 2008, BET officially canceled Rap City, its last airing was Saturday, November 8, 2008, and was replaced by now-cancelled The Deal on November 10, 2008. On Friday, June 12, 2009, a Rap City: Relapse special was aired on BET hosted by Big Tigger with guest Eminem. On November 6, 2013, Rap City returned with another special called EM360 with guest Eminem to promote his album The Marshall Mathers LP 2. In 2021, a Rap City '21 special was aired with Big Tigger as a host, with Fat Joe as guest.

References

External links 
 

1989 American television series debuts
1980s American music television series
1990s American music television series
2000s American music television series
2008 American television series endings
BET original programming
African-American television
Hip hop television